Jeremiah Russell (February 2, 1809 – June 13, 1885) was an American pioneer and territorial legislator.

Born in Eaton, New York, Russell moved to Fort Snelling, Wisconsin Territory in 1837. In 1845, he moved to what is now Sauk Rapids, Minnesota and founded the village in 1854. Russell was an Indian trader and stated a newspaper, the "Sauk Rapids Frontierman." In 1849, Russell served in the first Minnesota Territorial Legislature, in the Minnesota Territorial House of Representatives. He also served in various county offices in Benton County, Minnesota. He died in Sauk Rapids, Minnesota.

Notes

1809 births
1885 deaths
People from Madison County, New York
People from Sauk Rapids, Minnesota
Editors of Minnesota newspapers
American city founders
County officials in Minnesota
Members of the Minnesota Territorial Legislature
American newspaper editors
19th-century American journalists
American male journalists
19th-century American male writers
19th-century American politicians
Journalists from New York (state)
People from Fort Snelling, Minnesota